Martin Stoll (born 9 February 1983) is a retired German footballer who played as a centre-back. He is currently the U16 manager of Karlsruher SC.

Career
Stoll's first club was VfB Breitenbronn, but as Breitenbronn had no youth teams, Stoll had to play for SV Aglasterhausen's youth team, while still belonging to the club Breitenbronn. In the summer of 1995, Stoll moved for three years to SV Sandhausen.

In July 1998, Stoll joined Karlsruher SC II. After two years with Karlsruher SC II, in July 2000, he signed a contract with VfB Stuttgart II, before he returned to KSC in the summer of 2002. On 16 June 2009, he left Karlsruher SC and signed a three-year contract with Axpo Super League club FC Aarau. After just one season in Switzerland, Stoll returned to Germany with 3. Liga club Hansa Rostock, who he helped into second place and promotion come the end of the season. At the start of the 2011–12 season he moved to also newly promoted club Dynamo Dresden. Dynamo came ninth in the league that season, and previous clubs Hansa Rostock and Karlsruher SC were both relegated.

Despite this, he chose to move back to the 3. Liga and KSC at the end of the season, with whom he remained.

International career
Stoll is a youth international for Germany, and also was called up to the Germany Team 2006 in 2005.

Coaching career
Stoll retired at the end of the 2018–19 season and became U16 manager for Karlsruher SC.

References

External links
 

1983 births
Living people
German footballers
Germany youth international footballers
Germany B international footballers
Karlsruher SC II players
Karlsruher SC players
FC Aarau players
FC Hansa Rostock players
Dynamo Dresden players
Bundesliga players
2. Bundesliga players
Swiss Super League players
3. Liga players
Association football defenders
Sportspeople from Heidelberg
Footballers from Baden-Württemberg